The 2005 Leeward Islands Junior Championships in Athletics took place on May 28–29, 2005.  The event was held at the Yasco Sports Complex in St. John's, Antigua and Barbuda.  A detailed report was published.

A total of 44 events were contested, 25 by boys and 19 by girls.

Medal summary
Complete results can be found on the Nevis Amateur Athletic Association webpage.

Boys (U-20)

†: Open event for both U20 and U17 athletes.

Girls (U-20)

†: Open event for both U20 and U17 athletes.

Boys (U-17)

*: The published times for the 1500 metre race are not reasonable.  Might be intermediate results for 800 metres.

Girls (U-17)

Medal table (unofficial)
The unofficial medal count (below) differs slightly from the published medal table.

Team trophies
The final team scores were published.

Participation
According to an unofficial count, 109 athletes from 6 countries participated.

 (15)
 (31)
 (23)
 (9)
 (27)
 (4)

References

2005
Athletics in Antigua and Barbuda
Leeward Islands Junior Championships in Athletics
Leeward Islands Junior Championships in Athletics
Sport in St. John's, Antigua and Barbuda
2005 in youth sport